The North Gloucestershire Combination Junior Cup is an annual rugby union knock-out club competition organised by the North Gloucestershire Combination – one of the five bodies that make up the Gloucestershire Rugby Football Union.  It was first introduced during the 1913–14 season, with the inaugural winners being St. Marks 'A' and is the second most important rugby union cup competition in north Gloucestershire, ahead of the Glanville Cup but behind the Senior Cup.

The Junior Cup is currently open for clubs sides based in Gloucester and north Gloucestershire which are the 2nd teams of sides playing in the Senior Cup – although in the past the first teams of lower ranked clubs have also entered (for example when Old Cryptians won the Junior Cup in 2014).  The format is a knockout cup with a first round, quarter-finals, semi-finals and a final to be held at Kingsholm in Gloucester in April–May alongside the Senior and Glanville Cup finals.

North Gloucestershire Combination Junior Cup winners

Number of wins
Gordon League (18)
Matson (17)
Coney Hill (13)
Spartans (5)
West End (5)
Old Centralians (4)
Tredworth (4)
Longlevens (3)
Atlas Works (2)
Gloucester All Blues (2)
Old Cryptians (2)
Old Richians (2)
Painswick (2)
BNS (1)
Chosen Hill Former Pupils (1)
Churchdown (1)
Old Cryptians) (1)
R.N.O.C.A. (1)
St Marks (1)

Notes

See also
 North Gloucestershire Combination
 Gloucestershire RFU
 North Gloucestershire Combination Senior Cup
 North Gloucestershire Combination Glanville Cup
 English rugby union system
 Rugby union in England

References

External links
 North Gloucester Combination
 Gloucestershire RFU

Recurring sporting events established in 1913
1913 establishments in England
Rugby union cup competitions in England
Rugby union in Gloucestershire